The 2021–22 season was Milton Keynes Dons' 18th season in their existence, and the club's third consecutive season in League One. The club also competed in the FA Cup, EFL Cup and EFL Trophy.

The season covers the period from 1 July 2021 to 30 June 2022.

Managerial change
On 1 August 2021, manager Russell Martin departed the club to take up the vacant managerial position at Swansea City, with the buyout clause in his contract activated. On 3 August 2021, the club announced captain Dean Lewington would take over as interim manager whilst a permanent replacement was sought.

A successor was announced on 13 August 2021, with Liam Manning being revealed as the club's first ever Head Coach.

Pre-season friendlies
Milton Keynes Dons announced they will play friendly matches against King's Lynn Town, Chelmsford City, Bristol City and Tottenham Hotspur as part of their pre-season preparations.

Matches

Competitions

League One

League table

Results summary

Results by matchday

Matches

Play-offs

Matches

FA Cup

Matches

EFL Cup

Matches

EFL Trophy

Southern Group C table

Matches

Player details
 Note: Players' ages as of the club's final match of the 2021–22 season.

Transfers

Transfers in

Loans in

Loans out

Transfers out

Awards 
 EFL League One Manager of the Month (September): Liam Manning
 EFL Young Player of the Month (October): Matt O'Riley
 EFL League One Player of the Month (November): Scott Twine
 EFL League One Manager of the Month (January): Liam Manning
 EFL League One Team of the Season: Harry Darling, Scott Twine
 EFL League One Player of the Season: Scott Twine
PFA Team of the Year: Harry Darling, Scott Twine

References

External links 
 

Milton Keynes Dons
Milton Keynes Dons F.C. seasons